Frank Uduak-Abasi Akpan, also known as Ezekiel Uduak Akpan, is a Nigerian  from Uyo in Akwa Ibom State who was found guilty of kidnapping Iniubong Umoren,  known as  Hiny Humorenon Twitter

Uduak-Abasi Akpan was found guilty on Thursday 4 August 2022 by the Akwa Ibom State High Court in Uyo of killing jobseeker Iniubong Umoren.

Conviction 

Justice Bassey Nkanang, the trial judge, also gave Akpan a life sentence for rape in his ruling.
After the court ruling, Akpan attempted to run out of the court but the security personnel on the scene had to step in to stop him.

In his ruling on Thursday, the judge, Bassey Nkanang, stated that the convicted man will be hanged to death.

Mr. Akpan was given a life sentence after Mr. Nkanang found him guilty of rape. The prosecutor, according to the judge, has established beyond a reasonable doubt Mr. Akpan's guilt of both rape and murder.

However, he released and exonerated Mr. Akpan's father and sister, the second and third defendants in the case.

The convicted rapist attempted to flee the courtroom when the verdict was announced but was stopped by security personnel.

Umoren, a University of Uyo philosophy graduate, died in April 2021. While awaiting mobilization for the National Youth Service Corps (NYSC) program, she was looking for a job.

Iniubong Umoren, a philosophy graduate from the University of Uyo (UNIUYO), was murdered, raped, and buried in a small grave in April 2021 by Uduak-Abasi Akpan, a man accused of having committed other rapes.

With the promise of a job, Uduak-Abasi Akpan allegedly persuaded his 26-year-old victim to visit his family's home in Nung Ikono Obio village in the Uruan local government region where he raped, killed, and buried her in a shallow grave.

References

Nigerian people convicted of murder
People convicted of murder by Nigeria
2021 murders in Nigeria